Aleko Prodani (1942–2006) was an Albanian actor and Merited Artist of Albania.

Born in Korçë, southern Albania, in 1942, Prodani became one of the most acclaimed actors of the Andon Zako Çajupi Theatre. He died in 2006, on that same theatre's stage, while premiering Tre donne per un solo uomo of Dario Fo.

References

External links
 Aleko Prodani on IMDb

20th-century Albanian male actors
People from Korçë
1942 births
2006 deaths
Merited Artists of Albania
Deaths onstage
Albanian male stage actors
21st-century Albanian male actors